The 2001 Russian First Division was the 10th edition of Russian First Division. There were 18 teams.

League table

See also
2001 Russian Top Division

References
 PFL

2
Russian First League seasons
Russia
Russia